Stenocorus is a genus of beetles in the family Cerambycidae, containing the following species:

Stenocorus alteni (Giesbert & Hovore, 1998)
Stenocorus cinnamopterus (Randall, 1838)
Stenocorus copei (Linsley & Chemsak, 1972)
Stenocorus cylindricollis (Say, 1824)
Stenocorus flavolineatus (LeConte, 1854)
Stenocorus meridianus (Linnaeus, 1758)
Stenocorus nubifer (LeConte, 1859)
Stenocorus obtusus (LeConte, 1873)
Stenocorus schaumii (LeConte, 1850)
Stenocorus testaceus (Linsley & Chemsak, 1972)
Stenocorus trivittatus (Say, 1824)
Stenocorus vestitus (Haldeman, 1847)
Stenocorus vittiger (Randall, 1838)

References

Lepturinae